is a train station on the Kobe Municipal Subway Kaigan Line in Chūō-ku, Kobe, Hyōgo Prefecture, Japan.

Layout

An island platform serving two tracks is located on the 2nd basement, one level lower than the ticket gates.

Surroundings
Underground city
Duo Kobe
Metro Kobe
Sea side
Harborland
Harbor Walk
Mosaic
Umie
Kobe Crystal Tower (Kawasaki Heavy Industries, Ltd.)
Mountain side
Minatogawa Shrine
Kobe Bunka Hall
Kobe Municipal Central Library
Kobe District Court
Kobe University Hospital

Stations of Kobe Municipal Subway
Railway stations in Japan opened in 2001
Railway stations in Kobe